Getting Away with Murder is the fourth and third major-label studio album by the American rock band Papa Roach. The album was a departure from the band's previous works, showcasing an alternative rock and hard rock sound instead of a nu metal and rap metal sound. Unlike their previous albums, the album features no rapping and instead only features Jacoby Shaddix singing. It was released on August 31, 2004 via Geffen Records and has been certified Gold in Canada, Silver in the United Kingdom and Platinum in the United States. Getting Away with Murder peaked at number 17 on the Billboard 200.

Background
Production lasted from October to December 2003. During the recording of Getting Away With Murder, the band was not signed to a label as their previous label DreamWorks Records had recently been bought out. The band would later sign to Geffen Records. The album features a departure from the band's rap metal sound, as the band's vocalist Jacoby Shaddix was tired of rapping.

The track "Just Go (Never Look Back)" was recorded in the album's sessions, but was ultimately left off the album. The track would later be released on the band's future greatest hits album, ...To Be Loved: The Best of Papa Roach.

Release and promotion
Papa Roach released Getting Away With Murder on August 31, 2004. The album's first single was the title track. The album debuted at number 17 on the Billboard 200, with 52,000 copies sold, less than a half of "Lovehatetragedy". However, the title track saw success through radio and peaked at number two in the Mainstream Rock Tracks chart, number four on the Modern Rock Tracks and number 69 on the Billboard Hot 100. The second single, "Scars", peaked at number four on the Mainstream Rock Tracks chart,  number two on the Modern Rock Tracks chart, number 15 on the Billboard Hot 100, and number seven on the Pop Songs chart, becoming the band's biggest hit in the United States. "Scars" was ranked at number 36 as the greatest song of 2005 and as the most successful song of the year by Billboard, becoming the band's first and only song to be included on Billboards year-end charts, in addition, "Scars" was the band's first song to crossover to top 40 radio since their breakthrough hit, "Last Resort". The song "Take Me" also charted on the Alternative songs chart (at number 23), and on the Mainstream Rock Tracks chart (at number 11) despite not being released as a single. To support the album, the band toured throughout 2004 and 2005. Getting Away With Murder eventually achieved a Platinum certification in the United States, after spending 61 weeks on the Billboard 200 thanks to the hit of "Scars", outselling "Lovehatetragedy". It is their second best-selling album after their debut "Infest", also their first and only album to have at least two Hot 100 hits.

Several other tracks were used to promote the album across various mediums. The track "Blood (Empty Promises)" was featured on the Saw II soundtrack and the track "Getting Away with Murder" was featured in the end credits of The Chronicles of Riddick, as well as the video games MechAssault 2: Lone Wolf and MX vs. ATV Unleashed. "Not Listening" was used in the trailer for Resident Evil: Apocalypse and is also featured in the video games NASCAR 2005: Chase for the Cup, Gran Turismo 4, and FlatOut 2.

Reception

Critical response to Getting Away with Murder was mixed. At Metacritic, which assigns a normalized rating out of 100 to reviews from mainstream critics, the album has received an average score of 59, based on eight reviews.

Track listing

Personnel

Papa Roach
 Jacoby Shaddix – lead vocals 
 Jerry Horton – guitar, backing vocals
 Tobin Esperance – bass, backing vocals
 Dave Buckner – drums

Additional musicians
 Programming by Howard Benson and Paul Decarli
 Keyboards by Howard Benson

Production

 Produced by Howard Benson at Bay 7 Studios Valley Village, CA and Sparky Dark Studio, Calabasas, CA
 Mixed by Chris Lord-Alge at Image Recorders, Hollywood, CA
 "Blanket of Fear" mixed by Mike Plotnikoff at Bay 7 Studio, Valley Village, CA
 Recorded by Mike Plotnikoff
 Additional engineering by Eric Miller
 Pro Tools editing by Paul Decarli, Mike Plotnikoff, and Eric Miller
 Mastered by Ted Jensen at Sterling Sound, NYC
 Drum technician: Gersh for Drum Fetish
 Guitar guru: Keith Nelson
 Pre-production technician: Bob Wall
 Pre-production studios: Mates
 Production coordinator: Dana Childs
 Management by Mike Renault and Dennis Sanders
 Booking: Jenna Adler for Creative Artists Agency
 European booking: John Jackson for Helter Skelter
 Business management: Jonathan Schwartz for GSO
 Legal representation: Eric Greenspan for Myman, Abell, Fineman, Greenspan, and Light LLP
 A&R coordination: Graham Martin
 Marketing by Jen Littleton
 Art direction by Greg Patterson, Jerry Horton and Dave Buckner
 Band photography by Olaf Heine, Jerry Horton
 Additional photography: Michael D. Knight, Lisa Sweet, and Dave Rau
 Graphic design: Greg Patterson for singlemanriot.com
 Enhanced CD produced by Greg Patterson and Devin Dehaven for FORTRESSDVD
 Edited by Devin Dehaven, Tim Mardesich and Tony Minter
 Opening sequence by BACKWARDHEROES
 Avid DS operator: Bruce. W. Cathcart
 A&R: Ron Handler

Appearances
The song "Not Listening" was featured in the video games NASCAR 2005: Chase for the Cup in 2004, FlatOut 2 in 2006, and Gran Turismo 4, and was also featured in the trailer for the 2004 film Resident Evil: Apocalypse.
The song "Getting Away with Murder" was featured in MechAssault 2: Lone Wolf in 2004 and MX vs. ATV Unleashed in 2005.
The song "Stop Looking Start Seeing" was featured in EA's NFL Street 2 in 2004.

Charts

Weekly charts

Year-end charts

Singles

Certifications

References

Geffen Records albums
Papa Roach albums
2004 albums